NES Open Tournament Golf, known in Japan as  is a sports video game developed and published by Nintendo for the Nintendo Entertainment System. NES Open Tournament Golf is the second Nintendo published golf-based video game released for the NES, the first game being Golf. In addition to the Famicom version of Golf, there were two other Nintendo published golf-based video games released in Japan. These games were released in disk format on the Family Computer Disk System in 1987. These two games were Family Computer Golf: Japan Course and Family Computer Golf: U.S. Course.

Like most Mario games released around the time, the first player played as Mario, and the second player played as Luigi. At certain points during gameplay, the Mario Bros. are offered advice by their caddies, Princess Toadstool (Peach) and Princess Daisy. Another non-playable character was Mario's old nemesis Donkey Kong, who now works as an accountant securing the prize money for Mario and Luigi. NES Open Tournament Golf is often thought to be nearly identical to the Famicom version Mario Open Golf based on the fact that they both feature identical graphics and gameplay. However, there are many differences between the two games. For starters, Mario Open Golf featured five playable courses whereas NES Open Tournament Golf only featured three. The background music between both games also differed, with the exception of a few tracks that were used in both games.

The Famicom version, Mario Open Golf is significantly more difficult than the NES version. Most of the holes seen in Mario Open Golf are not found in NES Open Tournament Golf, though there are a few holes that exist in both versions without any modifications. If someone plays Mario Open Golf they will notice a handful of holes that look nearly identical to the holes in NES Open Tournament Golf, but with more obstacles. It is likely that some of these obstacles were removed from the western release of the game to make it less difficult.

Gameplay
NES Open Tournament Golf featured three different courses. Those courses were the US Course, Japan Course, and the UK Course. Although the Japan Course and UK Course are also playable courses in Mario Open Golf they do not contain the same holes. There are some holes in each course that are identical or nearly identical to holes found in NES Open Tournament Golf. For example, hole number one in the Australia Course is hole number nine in the US Course. Mario Open Golf featured five different courses. Those courses were the Japan Course, the Australia Course, the France Course, the Hawaii Course, and the UK Course. In addition to those five courses an Extra Course is also available. The Extra Course contains a mix of holes from the other five courses.

Release

This game was released for the Disk System on February 21, 1987. Family Computer Golf: Japan Course is very similar to the original Golf which was released for the Famicom in 1984. In this version of the game you can consistently see the bird's eye view of the course on the right-side of the screen, while the left side of the screen consistently showed a third-person view. Two modes of play are available in the game, stroke play and match play. Though the course designs are similar to those found in NES Open Tournament Golf, the controls are slightly different. You can choose between three different speeds at which you hit the ball, and you can also cycle between golf clubs. In this version however, the default club will always be a 1W, whereas in later games an appropriate club would be pre-selected for you. The scorecard in this game is nearly identical to the one found in NES Open Tournament Golf.

This game came on a blue disk card, when most disks at the time were yellow. The blue disk indicated that it could be used in machines called a Disk Fax as part of a contest in Japan. Players' high scores were saved on the disk, and by using the name entry feature in the game to enter their personal data, players could send the data to Nintendo using the Disk Fax. The winners of the contest received a golden disk containing a more difficult version of the game.

This game was released for the Disk System on June 14, 1987. Family Computer Golf: U.S Course is similar to the original Golf and Mario Open Golf. In this version of the game a bird's eye view of the course is shown on the center of the screen, while the right side of the screen shows a third-person view. Once you were ready to hit the ball the bird's eye view transitioned to a screen with just the third-person view. This concept was slightly modified and used in Mario Open Golf which was released in September 1991.

Mario Open Golf was one of the first titles released on Nintendo's arcade machine, the PlayChoice-10. Each machine had a mix of ten different NES games to choose from. For each token, players would be given a fixed amount of time to play any of the ten games on the PlayChoice-10. The dual-screen cabinet gave instructions on the top-screen, while the lower screen was used to show the actual game. The typical amount of time per token was 300 seconds, of which the player could switch in and out of different games if they so desired. The arcade machine's main circuit board had the ability to plug-in 10 different games, similar to the circuit board of an NES cartridge. PlayChoice games varied slightly from their original NES counterparts, as additional circuitry was needed to allow the game to run on the arcade machine.

Mario Open Golf for the PlayChoice-10 was most similar to that of NES Open Tournament Golf, more so than Mario Open Golf for the Famicom. There were some differences from NES Open Tournament Golf, however, such as no tournament mode in Mario Open Golf. The PlayChoice-10 also featured the original Golf video game for the NES as one of the games in its library. It was also released for the Nintendo 3DS Virtual Console on July 5, 2012, and the Nintendo Switch Online service on October 10, 2018.

Other media
Mario Open Golf is one of the video games featuring in the manga titled Cyber Boy, by Nagai Noriaki, Published by Coro Coro Comic and Shogakukan, from 1991 to 1993. Mario's outfit from this game is an alternate costume for the character in Super Smash Bros. for Nintendo 3DS and Wii U, as well as in Super Mario Odyssey and Super Smash Bros. Ultimate. Mario Golf: Super Rush and Mario Kart Tour also included Luigi's outfit in addition to Mario's.

Reception

Notes

References

1991 video games
Mario Golf
Nintendo Entertainment System games
Nintendo Research & Development 2 games
Golf video games
Video games developed in Japan
Video games scored by Akito Nakatsuka
Video games set in Australia
Video games set in France
Video games set in Hawaii
Video games set in Japan
Video games set in the United Kingdom
Video games set in the United States
Virtual Console games for Wii
Virtual Console games for Nintendo 3DS
Virtual Console games for Wii U
PlayChoice-10 games
Multiplayer video games
Nintendo games
Nintendo arcade games
Nintendo Switch Online games